Srah Chik  is a khum (commune) of Phnom Srok District in Banteay Meanchey Province in western Cambodia.

Villages

 Moat Srah
 Srah Chhuk Khang Lech
 Srah Chik
 Kouk Kraol
 Kouk Rumchek
 Kouk Ta Reach
 Kandal Khang Lech
 Kandal Khang Kaeut
 Srah Chhuk Khang Kaeut

References

Communes of Banteay Meanchey province
Phnom Srok District